"After Hours" is a 1969 song written by Lou Reed and originally performed by the Velvet Underground. It is the tenth and final track on their self-titled third album. It is one of few songs with lead vocals by drummer Maureen Tucker, as Lou Reed stated the song was "so innocent and pure" that he could not possibly sing it himself. Tucker's vocals are accompanied by acoustic and bass guitar. The style of the lyrics and the music is somewhat reminiscent of Tin Pan Alley songs of the 1930s.

Music video
In 2014, Universal Music Enterprises held a contest in collaboration with Genero to create an official music video for the song. From 120 submissions, the video by Choking Monkey Productions was picked as the winner and subsequently uploaded to the Velvet Underground Vevo YouTube channel.

Covers

 R.E.M.  performed the song whilst touring the album Green, one performance being recorded on the Tourfilm DVD. 
 Blind Melon singer Shannon Hoon sang it briefly at a concert in 1995, which can be seen/heard at the ending of the DVD Letters from a Porcupine. 
 Meg White, of the White Stripes, covered the song on December 31, 2000 to conclude their New Year's Eve concert and was available as a limited release by Third Man Records as Vault Package #44.
 Anthony Kiedis and John Frusciante of Red Hot Chili Peppers played the song in 1991 on a boat while being interviewed by the VPRO in Amsterdam, the Netherlands. 
 Rilo Kiley also recorded a version in 2002 for a split EP. 
 James Iha performed the song with A Perfect Circle on January 31, 2004 on a tour in France after Maynard James Keenan challenged Americans in the audience to not use flash photography. 
 Autolux drummer, Carla Azar performed the song as an encore while playing at the Henry Fonda Theatre. 
 A cover by Babyshambles is featured on the deluxe edition of their 2013 album Sequel to the Prequel.
 Eddie Vedder performed the song during the Pearl Jam North American tour of 2013 as a tribute to Lou Reed.

Personnel (on original recording)
 Maureen Tucker – vocals
 Lou Reed – acoustic guitar
 Doug Yule – bass

References

The Velvet Underground songs
1969 songs
Songs written by Lou Reed